Richard Gerard van Dyke (August 27, 1931 – December 2, 1986) was an American politician in the state of Washington. He served in the Washington House of Representatives from 1985 to 1986 for District 39. Van Dyke was from Bothell, Washington and defeated incumbent representative Bill Miller in the 1984 elections by 197 votes. He was defeated for re-election in 1986, and in failing health due to diabetes, died by suicide from carbon monoxide poisoning on December 2, 1986.

References

1931 births
1986 deaths
Republican Party members of the Washington House of Representatives
20th-century American politicians
1986 suicides